Volkan Altın (born 10 August 1986) is a German professional footballer who plays as a defensive midfielder for German club BSV Hürtürkel.

References

1986 births
Living people
Antalyaspor footballers
German footballers
German people of Turkish descent
Association football midfielders
Footballers from Berlin
Süper Lig players
Altay S.K. footballers